Allium jesdianum is a species of onion found mainly in Iran, with populations in Afghanistan and possibly Iraq and Uzbekistan. It is cultivated around the world as an ornamental. Its 'Akbulak' and 'Early Emperor' cultivars gained the Royal Horticultural Society's Award of Garden Merit in 2016, and are also considered by them as good plants to attract pollinators. It has been incorrectly listed for sale by commercial nurseries as Allium rosenbachianum.

Description
The flowers have prominent white stamens projecting beyond the rose-purple slender petals. A wider variety of petal colors can be found in the many cultivars.

The cultivars 'Akbulak' and 'Early Emperor' have won the Royal Horticultural Society's Award of Garden Merit.

References

jesdianum
Onions
Garden plants of Asia
Flora of Western Asia
Flora of Central Asia
Plants described in 1860
Taxa named by Pierre Edmond Boissier
Taxa named by Friedrich Alexander Buhse